CSN is the fifth album by Crosby, Stills & Nash, released on Atlantic Records on June 17, 1977. It is the group's second studio release in the trio configuration. It peaked at No. 2 on the Billboard Top Pop Albums chart; two singles taken from the album, Nash's "Just a Song Before I Go" (No. 7) and Stills' "Fair Game" (No. 43) charted on the Billboard Hot 100. It is currently the trio configuration's best selling record, outselling 1969's Crosby, Stills & Nash by 200,000 copies. It has been certified quadruple platinum by RIAA.

Content
Following their tour in the spring and summer of 1970 to support Déjà Vu, Crosby, Stills and Nash had only completed one project together, a 1974 reunion tour of CSNY. David Crosby and Graham Nash had recorded three albums as a duo, with Crosby releasing a single solo album (in addition to a Byrds reunion album) and Nash a pair. Stephen Stills pursued other projects including the release of four solo albums, a short career with Manassas that yielded two albums, as well as a tour and an album with Neil Young, which itself nearly became a CSNY project.

CSN featured strong writing from all three members, the last time for seventeen years that the band would compose songs and handle vocals without major assistance from outside sources.

Many of Stills' songs on the album echo his marital problems, with "Dark Star" returning to the Latin rhythms he had favored all the way back to his Buffalo Springfield days. Crosby continued the existential probings consistent with much of his past work, and Nash offered both a radio-ready acoustic ballad with "Just a Song Before I Go", and an elaborate set piece re-creating a vision of a hashish experience that he had in Winchester Cathedral with "Cathedral". Many tracks included a string section, a first on a CSN project.

The album was released for compact disc an initial time in the 1980s, then again at Ocean View Digital from the original tapes and reissued on September 20, 1994. It was remastered once more by Steve Hoffman in April 2013, for an Audio Fidelity 24kt gold disk release in the summer of 2013.

Cash Box said that "Fair Game" "combines a snappy Latin rhythm, neatly interlocking harmonies, and layers of Stephen Stills' thoughtful acoustic guitar work."  It commented on the "surging guitars and piano" and "harmonic hooks" and "powerful rhythmic elements" of "I Give You Give Blind".

Record World called "Fair Game" a "mid-tempo Stills song with samba touches, with the trio's trademark vocal harmonies again standing out."

Track listing
Side oneSide two

Personnel
 David Crosby – vocals; rhythm guitar on "Fair Game" and "Dark Star"; acoustic guitar on "Just A Song Before I Go" and "In My Dreams"; string arrangements on "Cathedral" and "Cold Rain"
 Stephen Stills – vocals; guitars on all tracks except "Carried Away", "Cathedral" and "Cold Rain" electric piano on "Anything at All"; piano, string arrangements on "I Give You Give Blind"; timbales on "Fair Game"
 Graham Nash – vocals; piano on "Carried Away", "Cathedral", "Just A Song Before I Go", and "Cold Rain"; harmonica on "Carried Away"; string arrangements on "Cathedral" and "Cold Rain"
Additional musicians
 Joe Vitale – drums on "Carried Away", "Fair Game", "Cathedral", "Dark Star", "Run From Tears" and "I Give You Give Blind"; organ on "Shadow Captain", "Fair Game", "Anything at All", "Dark Star"; electric piano on "Carried Away", "Just A Song Before I Go"; percussion on "Cathedral", "I Give You Give Blind"; flute on "Shadow Captain"; timpani on "Cathedral"; vibraphone on "In My Dreams"
 Craig Doerge – piano on "Shadow Captain" and "Anything at All"; electric piano on "Shadow Captain" and "Dark Star"
 Mike Finnigan – organ on "Run From Tears"
 George "Chocolate" Perry – bass on "Shadow Captain", "Fair Game", "Anything at All", "Cathedral", "Dark Star", and "I Give You Give Blind"
 Jimmy Haslip – bass on "Carried Away"
 Tim Drummond – bass on "Just A Song Before I Go"
 Gerald Johnson – bass on "Run From Tears"
 Russ Kunkel – drums on "Shadow Captain", "Anything at All", "Just A Song Before I Go", and "In My Dreams"; congas on "Shadow Captain", "Dark Star"; percussion on "Just A Song Before I Go"
 Ray Barretto – congas on "Fair Game"
 Mike Lewis – string arrangements on "Cathedral", "Cold Rain", and "I Give You Give Blind"
 Joel Bernstein – string arrangements on "Cathedral"
Production
 Crosby, Stills & Nash – producers
 Howard Albert, Ron Albert – co-producers, engineers
 Steve Gursky – assistant engineer
 Joel Bernstein – photography
 Gary Burden – art direction, design
 Joe Gastwirt – digital remastering

Charts

Year-end charts

Certifications

Tour

References

Further reading

External links 
 

1977 albums
Atlantic Records albums
Crosby, Stills, Nash & Young albums
Albums produced by David Crosby
Albums produced by Graham Nash
Albums produced by Stephen Stills
Albums produced by the Albert Brothers